The 1998–99 season was Stoke City's 92nd season in the Football League and the fifth in the third tier.

Stoke entered a new era at their 28,000 seater stadium in the third tier of English football with heavy debts of around £5 million and had no manager the future seemed very uncertain. It came as a welcome surprise then when chairman Keith Humphreys appointed former Aston Villa manager Brian Little. And Little's new look side started the season on fire winning six straight matches as it looked like that Stoke would be too good for their Second Division opponents. By November it seemed a matter of when and not if Stoke would gain promotion but their form completely dropped off and just one win was registered from the end of November to March. Chief executive Jez Moxey was now coming in for some serious pressure to resign by the supporters due to the poor finances and with no chance of promotion Stoke finished in 8th place with 69 points. Little had since lost interest way before the end of the season and he resigned in July leaving Stoke to find another manager.

Season review

League
Chief executive Jez Moxey predicted that Stoke would lose around £1 million a year through being in the Second Division, such was the price Stoke had to pay after poor financial mismanagement on moving to the Britannia Stadium. In an attempt to retain fan interest, season ticket prices were frozen and chairman Keith Humphreys apologised for the past nine months of "bloody awful football" and he also appealed to the supporter group S.O.S (Save Our Stoke) to lift their ban on season tickets and merchandise. SOS wanted to starve out the current board and force them to sell in order to breathe fresh life back into the club. It came as a welcome surprise then when chairman Keith Humphreys appointed former Aston Villa manager Brian Little. Accepting that there was hardly any money available, Little signed players from the lower leagues such as Bryan Small, Phil Robinson and David Oldfield.

Little's new look side started the 1998–99 season with a bang, winning their first six matches which included a 4–3 win at Preston North End and saw Stoke installed by the bookies as promotion favourites. However a remainder that the club still had incompetent people working there when Jez Moxey revealed that they had budgeted for three rounds in the League Cup, Stoke lost to Macclesfield Town in the first round and therefore lost some £125,000. On the pitch Stoke's run came to an end at Fulham and new signing Chris Short had breathing problems and had to be carried off, which would disrupt the balance of the team and his condition would eventually end his career. Up front the goals dried up with Kyle Lightbourne out injured and Simon Sturridge retiring the injuries slowed Stoke's progress and David Oldfield was having a poor time and became a target for the fans.

It was becoming frustrating for Stoke as promotion rivals Fulham spent £2 million on Barry Hayles whose goals would win them the title, and Stoke on the other hand had to rely on free transfers and loans as well as academy players. Stoke won one game between Christmas and the beginning of March, dropping out of the play-off places. Little was very unimpressed and after a 2–0 defeat at Millwall, who won despite having nine men for most of the match said: "That was the worst result in my twelve years in management". More protests by the supporters followed against Moxey and the directors as Stoke's slim hopes of making the play-offs ended with a humiliating 4–1 defeat at home to Bristol Rovers and Stoke finished the season in 8th place. Brian Little resigned in July 1999 saying: "I have tried my best and the disappointment is very hard to take. I hope the supporters understand that it's best that I leave". He soon joined West Bromwich Albion meaning that Stoke would at least get some compensation.

FA Cup
Stoke won their first FA Cup away tie in 26 years against league rivals Reading alas normal service was resumed in the next match a defeat at Swansea City.

League Cup
Stoke met nearby Macclesfield Town in the first round and came away embarrassed as the "Silkmen" won 3–2 on aggregate.

League Trophy
After beating Blackpool Stoke lost 2–1 at home to Rochdale.

Final league table

Results
Stoke's score comes first

Legend

Football League Second Division

FA Cup

League Cup

League Trophy

Squad statistics

References

Stoke City F.C. seasons
Stoke City